Nieves Álvarez (born 30 March 1974) is a Spanish model and television presenter.

Career 
In 1992, Álvarez was a finalist at the Elite Look of the Year model search competition held by Elite Model Management. She subsequently worked for Yves Saint Laurent, Christian Lacroix, Emanuel Ungaro, Vivienne Westwood, Jean-Paul Gaultier and Prada, among others.

In 2001, Álvarez related her personal experience with anorexia in the book Yo vencí la anorexia, which she wrote alongside Lola Cintado Tejada.

Since 2012, Álvarez has presented the television show Solo moda (retitled as Flash moda in 2014) for TVE, which focuses on the fashion industry.

References

External links

1974 births
Living people
People from Madrid
Spanish female models
Spanish television presenters
Spanish women television presenters